This list of churches in Ponce, Puerto Rico, consists of churches in the municipality of Ponce, Puerto Rico, that enjoy notability.

Church list summary table

Gallery

See also

External links

History of Puerto Rico
 
churches
Churches